Nasir al-Din Mahmud may be:
Nasir ad-Din Mahmud, Zengid Emir of Mossul 1219–1234
Nasir al-Din Muhammad (r. 1261–1318), Mihrabanid malik of Sistan.
Nasir al-Din Mahmud (Artuqid) (r. 1200–1222) of the Artuqids of Hisnkeyfa.

See also
Nasir al-Din (disambiguation), various meanings including a given name